NKT Arena Karlskrona is a multi-purpose sporting arena providing both indoors and outdoors amenities, and is located in Karlskrona, Sweden. The arena was opened on 28 October 2005. It is the home arena of the ice hockey team Karlskrona HK and has various restaurants.

Events
The construction was divided into six venues for ice hockey, curling, badminton, tennis, gymnastics, swimming, and handball. During ice hockey events, the arena seats 5,050 spectators.

The arena hosted the 3rd semi-final of Melodifestivalen 2006 and the 4th semi-final of Melodifestivalen 2008.

See also
List of indoor arenas in Sweden
List of indoor arenas in Nordic countries

References

External links 

Ice hockey venues in Sweden
Indoor ice hockey venues in Sweden
Sport in Karlskrona
Buildings and structures in Blekinge County
Telenor
Sports venues completed in 2005
2005 establishments in Sweden